Hulagu Khan Castle is a historical castle located in Osku County in East Azerbaijan Province, The longevity of this fortress dates back to the Sasanian Empire.

References 

Sasanian castles
Castles in Iran
Hulagu Khan
Buildings and structures in East Azerbaijan Province
Osku County